Galapagos Duck is an Australian jazz band. Formed in 1969, they have an extensive history of international touring, including:
 Montreux Jazz Festival, Switzerland
 Jazz Yatra Festival, Bombay, India
 American Musexpo
 Singapore International Jazz Festival
 Queenstown Jazz Festival, New Zealand
 Vanuatu International Jazz Festival, Vanuatu

The band formed in 1969 for the winter season at "The Kosciusko Ski Chalet, Charlottes Pass".

Before it moved to The Rocks Push jazz club in Sydney, the band in 1969 was Marty Mooney and Tom Hare (reeds), Chris Qua (bass and trumpet), and Des Windsor (piano and organ).

Bruce Viles (owner of the Rocks Push) established The Basement jazz club at Circular Quay in 1973 and Galapagos Duck opened there as the house band. At that time, the personnel was Marty Mooney and Tom Hare (reeds), Chris Qua (bass and trumpet), Willie Qua (drums and reeds) and Doug Robson (piano).

Some of the top names in Australian jazz have worked with the band at one time or another, including Dave Levy, Roger Frampton, Col Nolan, Paul McNamara and Warren Daly (ex-Daly-Wilson Big Band).

Discography
 1974, Ebony Quill
 1974, The Removalist
 1976, St. James
 1976, Moomba Jazz, live recording of various artists
 1977, Magnum
 1978, Right On Cue
 1979, In Flight
 1981, This Time
 1983, Voyage of The Beagle
 1985, Endangered Species
 1989, Habitat
 1997, Lonely George
 2006, Out Of The Blue

References

Sources
 Johnson, Bruce (1987), The Oxford Companion To Australian Jazz, Oxford University Press

External links
 Galapagos Duck website
  A Story of Jazz in Sydney - by Peter Boothman

Australian jazz ensembles